The Santa Cruz, Big Trees and Pacific Railway  is operated as a seasonal tourist attraction in Northern California, also referred to as the "Beach Train". Its partner line, the Roaring Camp & Big Trees Narrow Gauge Railroad, is a heritage railroad. 

The Beach Train uses diesel locomotives to haul vintage passenger cars over an  route between Felton, California, and Santa Cruz, California. The SCBT&P is one of very few railroads in North America with extensive street running rails, with trackage in Santa Cruz.

History

The railway began life as the  narrow gauge Santa Cruz & Felton Railroad, built between its namesake cities of Santa Cruz and Felton in 1875 to send logs and lumber down from the Santa Cruz Mountains to mills and wharves on Monterey Bay. In 1880, the South Pacific Coast Railroad narrow gauge network completed its line from Alameda to Los Gatos, then over the mountains to Felton, absorbing the Santa Cruz & Felton to complete the line to Santa Cruz. 

In 1887, the Southern Pacific purchased the South Pacific Coast and converted it to standard gauge over the course of more than a decade. Washouts closed the majority of the line in 1940, and the Santa Cruz-Olympia section remained in operation to serve the timber and sand industries.  In 1981, further washouts brought closure of the line from Eblis to Olympia, until the line was purchased by Norman Clark, operator of the narrow gauge Roaring Camp & Big Trees Narrow Gauge Railroad and adjacent 1880s-themed park in Felton.  Local legend has it that the name "Roaring Camp" is historical too, coming from the moniker that Mexican authorities gave to what was then, in the 1840s, the wild settlement of Zayante, founded by mountain man Isaac Graham.  The first train from Felton to Rincon ran in 1985 (the year after Clark's death from pneumonia that he acquired in his work to reopen this line) and the entire line to Santa Cruz was once again reopened to traffic some time later.  Clark’s daughter Melani Jolley-Clark manages the company now.

Trains originate at the Roaring Camp depot in Felton, but the original Southern Pacific Coast depot at New Felton (built in 1880) still stands and serves as administrative offices for the company.  The freight shed, constructed from boards salvaged from the Boulder Creek to Felton log flume, is still used by the SCBT&P as a workshop.  The original Santa Cruz & Felton never crossed the San Lorenzo River and continued through the middle of the town of Felton.

In August of 1990 the railroad re-started freight service, moving lumber from Santa Cruz to Felton. 

On April 30, 2021, the railroad took over freight operations on a short section of the Santa Cruz Branch from Watsonville to Pajaro. The railroad uses a pair of CF7s acquired in June 2018 to connect customers in Watsonville to the main rail line at Pajaro.

In January 2022, the railroad was threatened with adverse abandonment following a closed-door meeting of the Santa Cruz County Regional Transportation Commission, alleged to be part of a larger effort to replace the Santa Cruz Branch with a rail trail by two local special interest groups known as Trail Now and Santa Cruz Greenway. During the June primary of the 2022 California elections, a ballot measure, Measure D, was put on the ballot to authorize the railbanking of the Santa Cruz Branch for an "interim trail"; it failed after an overwhelming "no" vote.

Locomotives
The SCBT&P utilizes two former Atchison, Topeka and Santa Fe CF7 locomotives as its current motive power. These former EMD F7 units were rebuilt by the Santa Fe at their Cleburne, Texas shops to their current, more practical arrangement following the end of passenger service. Both still carry their original ATSF road numbers, #2600 and #2641. In 2013 Locomotive 2641 was named in tribute to Gene O'Lague, a long time Southern Pacific engineer who was one of the original employees of Roaring Camp. A third locomotive, a Whitcomb 45-ton diesel switcher numbered 20, was retired in 1996 and stored; as of August 2022, the locomotive is being restored to operation for work train service. Santa Cruz-Portland Cement #2, an  steam locomotive built by H.K. Porter in 1906, has visited the railroad in the past.

In July 2018, two additional CF7 locomotives (#2467 and #2524) were acquired from the Texas Rock Crusher Railroad.

See also

List of heritage railroads in the United States
Roaring Camp and Big Trees Narrow-Gauge Railroad
Santa Cruz Railroad
Ocean Shore Railroad

References

External links

 
 Santa Cruz Trains - Google Map of Santa Cruz historic train routes

Heritage railroads in California
History of Santa Cruz County, California
California railroads
Switching and terminal railroads
Spin-offs of the Southern Pacific Transportation Company
Transportation in Santa Cruz County, California
Tourist attractions in Santa Cruz County, California
3 ft gauge railways in the United States
1875 establishments in California